Allium flavovirens is a species of onions endemic to the western part of Inner Mongolia. It grows in dry places at altitudes of 1800–3100 m.

Allium flavovirens has 2 or 3 bulbs, each up to 20 mm in diameter. Scapes are up to 25 cm long, round in cross-section. Flowers are white or pale yellow but appear reddish-purple from the underside.

References

flavovirens
Onions
Flora of Inner Mongolia
Plants described in 1887